G. australis  may refer to:
 Gallirallus australis, the weka or woodhen, a flightless bird species endemic to New Zealand
 Grevillea australis, a plant species found in Tasmania

See also
 Australis (disambiguation)